Beastmaster is a television series that aired from 1999 to 2002. It was loosely based on the 1982 MGM film The Beastmaster, which was itself loosely adapted from the novel The Beast Master by Andre Norton. The series aired 66 episodes over three complete seasons. It was produced by Coote/Hayes Productions.

The series was nominated for the Open Craft Award in the category of cinematography by the Australian Film Institute in 2000, and for the Saturn Award for Best Syndicated/Cable Television Series by the Academy of Science Fiction, Fantasy, and Horror Films, USA, in 2001. It did not win any of them.

Premise

Dar (Daniel Goddard) is the last survivor of his tribe. He wanders the lands seeking his lost loved one, Kyra (Natalie Jackson Mendoza), protecting the oppressed and the animals. His friend Tao (Jackson Raine) — a fearful, psychology-attracted young man — helps him in his quest; Tao is a scholar and a medicine man. Dar meets another orphaned warrior named Arina (Marjean Holden) who joins his quest for her own reasons, but eventually becomes a faithful companion. The world of the Beastmaster is full of lost tribes, genocide appears to be common, and all three of these characters are the survivors or last survivors of lost tribes.

The series also featured Monika Schnarre as the Sorceress, apprentice to the Ancient One, played by Grahame Bond, Emilie de Ravin as the Forest Demon named Curupira, and Sam Healy as Iara, the Demon of Water and Serpent (Curupira and Iara are inspired by the creatures of the same name from Brazilian mythology). The regular human enemy of Dar, King Zad, was played by Steven Grives. Marc Singer, the Beastmaster from the original film, appears in the third season as Dartanus, the Spirit Warrior who helps Dar on his quest. 
 
The general story arc of the series is that the world is changing, civilization is advancing, technology is gaining ground slowly, the old orders of magic and sorcery are fading, and the world is threatened by the supernatural being Balcifer, the Dark One, played by Jeremy Callaghan. Dar is the son of King Eldar, who was destroyed by Balcifer. To defeat Balcifer Dar must locate and reunite his family, who have been turned into animals to hide them from Balcifer, in the Crystal Arc.

Balcifer's agent on Earth is King Zad, who is first King of the Terrons, a savage tribe that enslaves and pillages at will. Later, when the tribe is destroyed by King Voden leading a group of Viking-like northerners, Zad re-emerges as the King of Xincha, the city at the center of the world (and Tao's former home). He has deposed Voden, who fled into the wilderness at the end of the second season. There is a contrast there between the crude savage badness of King Zad and the refined, insane evil genius of King Voden. Zad emerges from the contest a more civilized but still savage character.

The series was very action-oriented at the beginning, but as the first season wore on, it began to take on a pacifistic and naturalist tone. The
opening/ending music and soundtrack of the series were composed by Graeme Coleman.

Cast

 Daniel Goddard as Dar
 Natalie Jackson Mendoza as Kyra
 Jackson Raine as Tao 
 Monika Schnarre as the Sorceress
 Marjean Holden as Arina
 Dylan Bierk as The New Sorceress
 Grahame Bond as the Ancient One
 Steven Grives as King Zad

Episodes

Syndication
The series is shown on the UK FTA satellite channel Zone Horror (Sky EPG No. 321). It is shown every Monday, Wednesday and Friday at 11:30 a.m., 3:30 p.m. and 7:30 p.m. It also airs on a Saturday, at 12:00 p.m. and 6:30 p.m.

In the United States, syndication rights are held by Nexstar Media Group.

Home releases
ADV Films released all three seasons of Beastmaster on DVD in Region 1 (USA and Canada) as separate DVD sets for each season. Season 3 was released on 18 November 2003. Each set has six DVDs with 22 episodes per season and extras. The three seasons were also released as Beastmaster - The Complete Collection (5 August 2008). Licensing problems between ADV Films and Tribune Entertainment (owner of Beastmaster) caused these DVD sets to become rare soon after release.

Alliance Home Entertainment has released all three seasons of Beastmaster on DVD in Canada.

References

External links
 Beastmaster official site. Archived from the original on 30 November 2004.
 Beastmaster official site (Syfy). Archived from the original on 14 December 2004.
 
 Beastmaster at AustLit

1999 American television series debuts
2002 American television series endings
1999 Australian television series debuts
2002 Australian television series endings
1999 Canadian television series debuts
2002 Canadian television series endings
Television series about animals
American action television series
American adventure television series
American fantasy television series
Australian action television series
Australian fantasy television series
Canadian action television series
Canadian adventure television series
Canadian fantasy television series
English-language television shows
First-run syndicated television programs in the United States
ADV Films
Live action television shows based on films
Television series by Tribune Entertainment
Television series by Alliance Atlantis
1990s American drama television series
2000s American drama television series
1990s Canadian drama television series
2000s Canadian drama television series
Canadian action adventure television series
Australian action adventure television series